There are 18 correction and rehabilitation centers / CRCs (ar. مركز اصلاح وتاهيل)  in the Hashemite Kingdom of Jordan which are operated by the Public Security Departments prison service which answers to the Ministry of Interior.

List of Jordanian prisons
Qafqafa, al Mwaggar 1, and Swaqa incarcerate only convicts and the rest house detainees and convicts in separate housing areas.

Swaqa correction center is the largest of all these centers with a capacity of 2200 inmates. It provides vocational and cultural rehabilitation programs

Fuhais mental hospital accommodates mentally ill prisoners.

The three main inspection bodies include Human Rights Watch, ICRC and the National Centre for Human Rights (Jordan)

Human rights abuses
 The use of Castor oil pills during the initial examination. The goal is to provoke diarrhea in order to prevent prisoners from smuggling pills, drugs, razor blades and the like which were previously swallowed into the prison.
 Beatings by Darak and prison guards with metal sticks and cables

Notable events
 Riots broke out among the Tanzimat of Juwaida, Swaqa and Qafqafa in March and April 2006

References

Prisons in Jordan